is a Japanese voice actor from Aichi, Japan and is attached to Office Kaoru.

Voice roles
Shaman King (2001), Free Day; Silver Horn
Strawberry Eggs (2001), Girl (ep 12)
Chobits (2002), Bamboo Pole Seller (ep 15); Salaryman (ep 1)
The Twelve Kingdoms (2002), Man 1 (Ep 4)
Darker than Black (2007), Man (ep 21)
Noramimi (2008), Shigeru's Father (ep 11); Yocchan's Father (ep 6)
Shigofumi: Letters from the Departed (2008), Store keeper (ep 4)
Stitch! (2008), Mr. Suzuki
Toshokan Sensō (2008), Ryusuke Genda
The Tower of Druaga: The Aegis of Uruk (2008), Ambu
Naruto: Shippuden (2009), Tetsuru; Taiseki; Tsukushi; Ginji
Umi Monogatari (2009), Tabata-san
Cat Planet Cuties (2010), Endō
Appleseed XIII (2011), Reese
Mushibugyo (2013), Tokugawa Yoshimune
Unknown date
Adult Education ~Shinshi Choukyou~ as Adachi

Dubbing

Live-action
Moon, Thompson (Benedict Wong)

Animation
Chuggington, Harrison
T.U.F.F. Puppy, Chief

References

External links

1974 births
Living people
Japanese male voice actors
Actors from Aichi Prefecture